Laura Critchley (born 27 March 1984) is an English singer and songwriter.

Biography

Laura Critchley was born in Little Sutton, Ellesmere Port, Cheshire. With a voice described as that from a love child of Rod Stewart and Stevie Nicks, Critchley started singing when she was 7 years old. She wrote her first song, "Change", at the age of 16. It received radio play on BBC Radio Merseyside on the Billy Butler and Jimmy McCracken show. She got to the last 50 in Fame Academy in 2001, and appeared as Jessica Simpson on Stars in Their Eyes.

In 2006, she moved to London and within three months was signed to independent record label, Big Print Records, owned and run by Andrew Gemmell and Jeremy Marsh (RCA Telstar).
 She toured with the Sugababes in March 2007, with Ray Quinn in October 2007, with Deacon Blue in November 2007, and with Boyzone in May 2008.

Critchley's début album, Sometimes I, was released on 19 November 2007. Radio 2 Terry Wogan has praised Critchley saying that her single was an excellent single and that she was one to look out for.

Also in 2007, she recorded three songs with Robbie Williams. In December she sang at Ronan Keating's cancer research ball, and also duetted with him on a version of "Last thing on my mind".

Her first single, "Sometimes I" was released on 21 May 2007. Produced by Steve Power, the man who worked on many of Robbie Williams' hits with him, the single did not chart, but did well on the video channels. 
The second single "What do we do" was on the Radio 2 playlist on the Terry Wogan show, and was released on 12 November 2007. 
Her third single is a remix of "Sometimes I", by Ash Howes (who has worked with Girls Aloud and the Sugababes) and was released on 25 February 2008.
Critchley's fourth single "Today's Another Day" was released on 16 June 2008 and was a radio hit, reaching number 4 in the independent charts.
On 6 July 2009, Critchley released her single "Feel Proud" which she wrote with UK troops in mind. Profits went to the Help For Heroes charity.
Critchley's songs have been on the Radio 2 playlists as well as many regional stations such as Radio Ulster.

Having supported The Sugababes, and Boyzone on their respective arena tours, duetted with Ronan Keating and sung for Robbie Williams, She won the best live performance award at the Irish Entertainment Awards in October 2008.

Critchley performed her debut American showcase on 1 May 2008, to which many record execs went. Jeff Arch (the Sleepless in Seattle writer) also directed her video for the single "Today's Another Day".

A 10 part series for Discovery Channel called Kenwood Glamour Puds has used Critchley's music as the title music and sound beds. 

Glamour puds, featuring Critchley's music, has since been shown on Channel 4 on daytime TV. In 2010, Critchley was picked by Tom Jones to be one of his two backing singers during his worldwide performances and promotion of his album, Praise and Blame. She appeared on Good Morning America as well as many other shows around the world with Jones.

Other work
Critchley was chosen as the face of new airline Fly Pink. She is a patron of autism charity Wishing Well House. Screenwriter Jeff Arch has written a scene for Critchley in his upcoming film The Chelsea Story set to star John Cusack and Naomi Watts. He has since also asked her to write the title track for the film as well.
Laura has also accepted a request from the Duchess of York, to be one of her charity's (Children in Crisis) celebrity ambassadors for 2008.

Discography
"Sometimes I" is the second single by Critchley that launched her music career from her MySpace page. It was released on 21 May 2007. It was produced by Steve Power, the man behind many of Robbie Williams hits, the single did not chart, but did well on the video channels.

A re-mix of the song was released as Critchley's fourth single on 25 February 2008.

Albums
Sometimes I – (19 November 2007)

Singles
 from Sometimes I
"Don't Say" – (26 March 2007)
"Sometimes I" – (21 May 2007)
"What Do We Do" – (12 November 2007)
"Sometimes I" (re-mix) – (25 February 2008)
"Today's Another Day" – (16 June 2008)
 non-album single
"Feel Proud" – (6 July 2009)

References

External links
Get Ready To Rock.com Review of Sometimes I

1984 births
Living people
21st-century English women singers
21st-century English singers